Acidaspis is an extinct genus of odontopleurid trilobite from the Ordovician to Silurian of North America and Europe. Although small, it had long spines along its body.

Reassigned species 

Acidaspis emarginata = Anabaraspis emarginata

References 

Odontopleuridae
Odontopleurida genera
Ordovician trilobites of North America
Silurian trilobites of Europe
Silurian trilobites of North America
Paleontology in Ohio
Paleontology in New York (state)
Paleozoic life of Ontario
Paleozoic life of the Northwest Territories
Paleozoic life of Nunavut
Paleozoic life of Quebec